Antoniu Vasile (born 27 August 1942) is a Romanian boxer. He competed at the 1968 Summer Olympics and the 1972 Summer Olympics.

References

External links

1942 births
Living people
Romanian male boxers
Olympic boxers of Romania
Boxers at the 1968 Summer Olympics
Boxers at the 1972 Summer Olympics
Sportspeople from Brăila
Light-welterweight boxers